Colposcopy ( + skopos 'look at') is a painful medical diagnostic procedure to visually examine the cervix as well as the vagina and vulva using a colposcope. Numbing should be requested prior to proceedure.

The main goal of colposcopy is to prevent cervical cancer by detecting and treating precancerous lesions early.  Human Papillomavirus (HPV) is a common infection and the underlying cause for most cervical cancers. Smoking also makes developing cervical abnormalities more likely.

Other reasons for a patient to have a colposcopy include assessment of diethylstilbestrol (DES) exposure in utero, immunosuppression, abnormal appearance of the cervix or as a part of a sexual assault forensic examination.

Colposcopy is done using a colposcope, which provides a magnified and illuminated view of the areas, allowing the colposcopist to visually distinguish normal from abnormal appearing tissue, such as damaged or abnormal changes in the tissue (lesions), and take directed biopsies for further pathological examination if needed.  

The procedure was developed by the German physician Hans Hinselmann, with help from Eduard Wirths. The development of colposcopy involved experimentation on Jewish inmates from Auschwitz.

Indications 

Most women undergo a colposcopy to further investigate an abnormal pap test result (cytological).

Other reasons for a patient to have a colposcopy include:
 assessment of diethylstilbestrol (DES) exposure in utero,
 immunosuppression such as HIV infection, or an organ transplant patient
 an abnormal appearance of the cervix as noted by a primary care provider
 as a part of a sexual assault forensic examination using a specialized colposcope equipped with a camera

Many physicians base their current evaluation and treatment decisions on the report "Evidence-Based Consensus Recommendations for Colposcopy Practice for Cervical Cancer Prevention in the United States", developed by the American Society for Colposcopy and Cervical Pathology, most recently in 2017.

Colposcopy is not generally performed for people with pap test results showing low-grade squamous intraepithelial lesion (LSIL) or less. SIL's are an abnormal growth of epithelial cells, known as a lesion, on the surface of the cervix. Unless the person has a visible lesion, colposcopy for this population does not detect a recurrence of cancer.

Procedure 

During the initial evaluation, a medical history is obtained. The procedure is fully described to the patient. In some cases a pregnancy test may be performed before the procedure and the patient then signs a consent form. Colposcopy is performed with the woman lying back, legs in stirrups, and buttocks at the lower edge of the table (a position known as the dorsal lithotomy position). A speculum is placed in the vagina after the vulva is examined for any suspicious lesions.

A colposcope is used to identify visible clues suggestive of abnormal tissue. It functions as a lighted binocular or monocular microscope to magnify the view of the cervix, vagina, and vulvar surface. Low magnification (2× to 6×) may be used to obtain a general impression of the surface architecture. 8× to 25× magnification are utilized to evaluate the vagina and cervix. High magnification together with green filter is often used to identify certain vascular patterns that may indicate the presence of more advanced pre-cancerous or cancerous lesions. 

The squamocolumnar junction, or "transformation zone", is a critical area on the cervix where many precancerous and cancerous lesions most often arise. The ability to see the transformation zone and the entire extent of any lesion visualized determines whether an adequate colposcopic examination is attainable.

Acetic acid solution is applied to the surface of the cervix using cotton swabs to improve visualization of abnormal areas.. Areas of the cervix that turn white (acetowhiteness) after the application of acetic acid or have an abnormal vascular pattern are often considered for biopsy. If no lesions are visible, an iodine solution may be applied to the cervix to help highlight areas of abnormality.

After a complete examination, the colposcopist determines the areas with the highest degree of visible abnormality and may obtain biopsies from these areas using a long biopsy instrument, such as a punch forceps, SpiraBrush CX or SoftBiopsy. Most doctors and patients consider anesthesia unnecessary; however, some colposcopists now recommend and use a topical anesthetic such as lidocaine or a cervical block to decrease patient discomfort, particularly if many biopsy samples are taken.

Following any biopsies, an endocervical curettage (ECC) is often done. The ECC utilizes a long straight curette, a Soft-ECC curette employing fabric to simultaneously collect tissue, or a cytobrush (like a small pipe-cleaner) to scrape the inside of the cervical canal. The ECC should never be done on a patient who is pregnant. Monsel's solution is applied with large cotton swabs to the surface of the cervix to control bleeding. This solution looks like mustard and turns black when exposed to blood. After the procedure this material will be expelled naturally: Patients can expect to have a thin coffee-ground like discharge for up to several days after the procedure. Alternatively, some physicians achieve hemostasis with silver nitrate.

Interpretation

One model for scoring colposcopy findings is the Swede Score, which assigns a score between 0 and 2 for 5 different parameters, based on what is visible during the colposcopy, as given in table below:

The total Swede Score ranges between 0 and 10. A score of 5 or above is reported to identify all potential high-grade lesions (HGL) and 8 or above to have a 90% chance of being a HGL. A score below 5 does not require biopsy because of low risk of cancer, a score from 5 to 7 requires biopsy, and a score 8 or above does not require biopsy because it is likely more efficient to intervene directly (e.g., by excision).

Complications 
Significant complications from a colposcopy are not common but may include bleeding, infection at the biopsy site or endometrium, and failure to identify the lesion.  Monsel's solution and silver nitrate interfere with the interpretation of biopsy specimens, so these substances should not be applied until all biopsies have been taken. Some patients experience a degree of discomfort during the curettage, and many experience discomfort during the biopsy.

Colposcopy with biopsy does not cause infertility or subfertility.

Follow up 

Adequate follow-up is critical to the success of this procedure. Treatments for significant lesions include ablative treatments (cryotherapy, thermocoagulation, and laser ablation) and excisional methods (loop electrosurgical excision procedure or LEEP, or Cervical conization).

References

External links 
 Colposcopy and Treatment of Cervical Intraepithelial Neoplasia:  A Beginner's Manual (IARC Screening Group)
 Atlas of colposcopy – principles and practice (IARC Screening Group)
 American Society for Colposcopy and Cervical Pathology
 Women & Babies Colposcopy and gynaecology procedures undertaken by the Women & Babies Consultants.

Diagnostic obstetrics and gynaecology
Endoscopy
Female genital procedures